Francesca "Cesca" Inskipp (1921 – 24 July 2021) was a British counselling teacher and author.

She worked at the Centre for Studies in Counselling. She was described, with Brigid Proctor, as having "led the development of supervision thinking, training and reflection in Britain".

Works 

 Skills training for counselling, London; Thousand Oaks: Sage, 2004.
 Counselling: the trainer's handbook. Cambridge : National Extension College, 1993.
 Skills for Supervising and Being Supervised. Alexia, 1990 (with Brigid Proctor).

References

External links 

 In-Conversation Series, 3, Francesca Inskipp and Brigid Proctor in Conversation With Frank Wills (Newport, Wales: University of South Wales, Newport, 2005)
 Creating Ripples - Francesca Inskipp RDP International Ltd  2016

1921 births
2021 deaths
Counseling
British women writers